Barnabo of the Mountains is a 1994 Italian drama film directed by Mario Brenta. It is based on Dino Buzzati's novel Bàrnabo delle montagne. It was entered into the 1994 Cannes Film Festival.

Cast
 Marco Pauletti - Barnabo
 Duilio Fontana - Berton
 Carlo Caserotti - Molo
 Antonio Vecelio - Marden
 Angelo Chiesura - Del Colle
 Alessandra Milan - Ines
 Elisa Gasperini - Grandmother
 Marco Tonin - Darrio
 Francesca Rita Giovannini - Toni's Widow
 Pino Tosca - Emigrant's Leader
 Alessandro Uccelli - Young Emingrant
 Mario Da Pra - Inspector
 Gianni Bailo - Captain
 Daniele Zannantonio - Mayor
 Angelo Fausti - Haircutter
 Armando Cesco Gaspare - Forest Ranger

References

External links

1994 films
Italian drama films
1990s Italian-language films
1994 drama films
Films directed by Mario Brenta
Films based on Italian novels
Films based on works by Dino Buzzati
1990s Italian films